George Horace Gallup Jr. (April 9, 1930 – November 21, 2011) was an American pollster, writer and executive at The Gallup Organization, which had been founded by his father, George Gallup. Gallup expanded the scope of the Gallup Poll to encompass a wider variety of topics, ranging from the outlook of American young people to religious beliefs.

Much of Gallup's writings and research focused on religion and spirituality in the United States. His works included The Saints Among Us, published in 1992, and The Next American Spirituality, published in 2002.

Born in Evanston, Illinois, Gallup graduated from the Lawrenceville School in 1948 and received a bachelor's degree in religion from Princeton University in 1953. In 1954, Gallup joined his father's polling company, The Gallup Organization, where he worked until his retirement in 2004. He and his brother, Alec Gallup, became co-chairmen of the company upon their father's death.

George Gallup was diagnosed with liver cancer in 2010. He died in Princeton, New Jersey, on November 21, 2011, at the age of 81.

He was married to Kingsley Hubby, with whom he had three children. He was an Episcopalian, who once considered the ministry but instead served as an active layman.

References

1930 births
2011 deaths
American statisticians
American Episcopalians
American non-fiction writers
Deaths from cancer in New Jersey
Deaths from liver cancer
Lawrenceville School alumni
Mathematicians from Illinois
Pollsters
Princeton University alumni
Writers from Evanston, Illinois